Cameron Corner is the geodetic point at which the Australian states of Queensland, New South Wales and South Australia meet.

 Cameron Corner, Queensland, the locality immediately north-east of the geodetic point
 Cameron Corner Survey Marker, the heritage-listed survey mark at the geodetic point